The Milpitas Monster (alternately known as The Mutant Beast) is a 1976 independent monster movie directed by Robert L. Burrill.

Plot 
When a landfill is overfull, and pollution reaches its maximum, a monster is born. Made from garbage, and bearing a resemblance to a giant fly, the Milpitas Monster has an uncontrollable desire to consume large quantities of garbage cans. Some high school students find out about the monster and attempt to destroy it.

Release

Theatrical release
The Milpitas Monster premiered in Milpitas, California on May 21, 1976.

Reception

The Milpitas Monster was largely ignored by mainstream critics upon its release.
Jeffrey Frentzen of Cinefantastique wrote in his review of the film, "Despite its inverse homages glorifying the grade-Z monster flicks, The Milpitas Monster is still more than just another lousy horror show." However, also noted the film's inherent charm, calling it "An offbeat, welcome diversion".
Joseph Ziemba from Bleeding Skull gave the film a negative review, writing, "Crude effects, both visually and audibly, walk hand-in-hand with people just hanging out and being themselves. Boredom sets in…then disappears…then sets in again. Beyond all of that, Milpitas is an earnest portrait of an entire community having good clean fun in Smalltown, USA during the mid-1970s."

References

External links 
 
 
 http://www.milpitasmonster.com/

1976 films
1976 horror films
1976 independent films
1970s monster movies
1970s science fiction horror films
American independent films
American monster movies
American science fiction horror films
Films shot in California
1970s English-language films
1970s American films